The 2016 season was Terengganu Football Association's 6th season in the Liga Super and the 21st consecutive season in the top-flight of Malaysian football. In addition, they were competing in the domestic tournaments, the Piala FA and the Piala Malaysia.

Coaching staff

Other information

Players

Squad information

Last update: 13 February 2016
Source: 
Ordered by squad number.
LPLocal player; FPForeign player; NRNon-registered player

Transfers and loans

All start dates are pending confirmation.

In

December

April

Out

December

April

Pre-season

Competitions

Liga Super

League table

Results summary

Results by round

Matches 

Kickoff times are in +08:00 GMT.

Piala FA

Piala Malaysia

Group stage

Statistics

Squad statistics

|-
! colspan="14" style="background:#dcdcdc; text-align:center"| Goalkeepers

|-
! colspan="14" style="background:#dcdcdc; text-align:center"| Defenders

|-
! colspan="14" style="background:#dcdcdc; text-align:center"| Midfielders

|-
! colspan="14" style="background:#dcdcdc; text-align:center"| Forwards

Disciplinary record

See also
 2016 Liga Super season

References

External links
 Terengganu FA Website

Terengganu FC seasons
Malaysian football clubs 2016 season
Malaysian football club seasons by club